Germanna was a German settlement in the Colony of Virginia, settled in two waves, first in 1714 and then in 1717. Virginia Lieutenant Governor Alexander Spotswood encouraged the immigration by advertising in Germany for miners to move to Virginia and establish a mining industry in the colony.

Etymology
The name "Germanna," selected by Lt. Governor Alexander Spotswood, reflected both the German immigrants who sailed across the Atlantic to Virginia and the British Queen, Anne, who was in power at the time of the first settlement at Germanna. Though she died only months after the Germans arrived, her name continues to be a part of the area.

History

As part of a series of land grants awarded to settlers to create a buffer against the French, the Privy Council granted Spotswood  in the newly created Spotsylvania County in 1720, of which the Germanna tract was the first, while he was Lieutenant Governor and actual executive head of the Virginia government. He served in this capacity between 1710 and 1722 and, in 1716, he carried out his famous Knights of the Golden Horseshoe Expedition and promoted many reforms and improvements.

Spotswood was replaced as the lieutenant governor by Hugh Drysdale some time in 1722.  Historians suggest his removal may have been the result of years of disharmony between himself and the Council, as well as when he accepted such a large amount of land, that he showed a disregard for the Crown policy which held that no single person or family could claim more than a thousand acres of Virginia land.

Spotswood established a colony of German immigrants on the Germanna tract in 1714, partly for frontier defense but mainly to operate his newly developed ironworks. Germanna was the seat of Spotsylvania County from 1720 to 1732. Spotswood erected a palatial home and, after the Germans moved away to Germantown, continued the ironworks with slave labor. In his later years he served as Deputy Postmaster General for the Colonies.

The Germanna Colonies consist primarily of the First Colony of forty-two persons from the Siegerland area in Germany brought to Virginia to work for Spotswood in 1714, and the Second Colony of twenty families from the Palatinate, Baden and Württemberg area of Germany brought in 1717,  but also include other German families who joined the first two colonies at later dates. Although many Germanna families later migrated southward and westward from Piedmont Virginia, genealogical evidence shows that many of the families intermarried for generations, producing a rich genealogical heritage.

The site of the first settlement, Fort Germanna, is located in present-day Orange County along the banks of the Rapidan River, with subsequent settlements of Germans being established on sites in present-day Culpeper and Spotsylvania counties.  Many Germanna families played roles in important events in early American history such as the American Revolution and migration west to Kentucky and beyond.

Preservation
The site of Fort Germanna is mostly open fields with intervening thickets of second-growth timber. The Fort Germanna site was listed on the National Register of Historic Places in 1978. Traces of the terraces of Spotswood's mansion which came to be known as the "Enchanted Castle" are still discernible.  The Germanna Foundation is conducting archaeological exploration of the Fort Germanna, Siegen Forest, and Salubria sites that it owns in Orange and Culpeper Counties.

The Germanna Foundation owns land on the original Germanna peninsula, on both sides of the Germanna Highway, State Route 3, near the site of the original Fort Germanna, once the westernmost outpost of colonial Virginia. The Foundation also owns a nearby 18th century mansion, Salubria, once the home of Governor Spotswood's widow. In October 2000, Salubria was donated by the Grayson family to the Germanna Foundation for historic preservation. The Foundation maintains a research library, a memorial garden, and plans interpretive walking trails to various historic and archaeological sites. In addition, the Foundation publishes histories and genealogical books, a newsletter, offers educational programs at an Annual Historical Conference and Reunion and to the community, and offers group travel to Germany geared to the origin of the Germanna families.

Timelines

First colony
The first colony consisted of the family surnames: Albrecht, Brombach/Brumback, Fischbach/Fishback, Hager, Friesenhagen, Heide/Heite/Hitt, Heimbach, Hofmann, Holzklau/Holtzclaw, Huttmann, Kemper/Camper, Cuntze/Koontz, Merdten/Martin, Otterbach/Utterback, Reinschmidt, Richter/Rector, Spielmann, Weber/Weaver 

1710 May 18 Incorporation of the George Ritter Company in London a joint stock company to be in business for 20 years.  Partners include Christoph de Graffenreid and Franz Ludwig Michel.  The Agent for the George Ritter Company is Johann Justus Albrecht, sent to the Siegerland to recruit miners in the Carolinas or Virginia.
1711 Aug 15 Johann Justus Albrecht signs a contract with the Ministers of Siegen 
1711 Sep 5 Hermannus Otterbach requests permission to Immigrate
1712 May 12 Johann Justus Albrecht composes the Union Book for the George Ritter Company
1713 Jul 12  Pastor Knabenschuh goes to Oberfischbach to find that Pastor Haeger is gone and the Schoolteacher, Hans Jacob Holtzklau "is also willing to travel away."
1713 Jul 17:Jacob Holzklau request permission to immigrate.  Hermann Otterbach requested permission to immigrate on 5 Sep 1711, first of the group to do so.
1713 Jul 31:Philip Fischbach/Hans Jacob Richter; Jost Cuntz request permission to immigrate.
Summer of 1713: the people arrived in London
January 1714: they left for Virginia on an unknown ship
Late March 1714: Spotswood first learns from Col. Nathaniel Blakiston, the agent for Virginia in London, that Germans are coming
April 1714: the Germans arrived in Virginia
1714: established first German Reformed church on the continent, which doubled as a defensive blockhouse
1716: they started mining operations at the silver mine --Need to prove this!
1718, early in the year: they were instructed to search for iron
1720 May 17: Johann Justus Albrecht file statement regarding "eleven Labouring men to work in Mines or Quarries at or near Germanna and we began to work March One Thousand Seven Hundred and 15/16 and so continued until Dec. One Thousand Seven Hundred & Eighteen."
By December 1718, Spotswood says he spent about 60 pounds on the endeavor so there was no iron furnace.
January 1719-20: Pastor Haeger and the members of the First Colony moved to Stafford County, Virginia which is present day Fauquier County, Virginia.  The three naturalized members of the group, John Fishback, John Hoffman and Jacob Holtzclaw, secured 1805 acres for distribution to the group to be divided equally.

Second colony

1717: Eighty-odd Germans from Wuerttemberg, Baden, and the Palatinate agree with Capt. Tarbett in London to take them to Pennsylvania in the ship Scott.
1717/1718: Capt. Tarbett hijacks the Germans to Virginia where they become indentured servants of Lt. Gov. Spotswood
1719/1722: Some of the Germans who left in 1717 arrived in Virginia at a later time
1723/25: Spotswood sues many of the Germans
1725: Most of these Germans move to the Robinson River Valley (today in Madison County, Virginia)
1733: Johann Caspar Stoever becomes their (Lutheran) pastor
1740: The German Lutheran Church (Hebron Lutheran Church today) is built with funds raised in Germany

Sources

External links
 National Park Service
 Memorial Foundation of the Germanna Colonies in Virginia, Inc.
 Fort Germanna
 Virginia Landmark Register 068-0043 Germanna Site

Archaeological sites on the National Register of Historic Places in Virginia
German-American history
German communities in the United States
German-American culture in Virginia
Colony of Virginia
History of the Thirteen Colonies
Orange County, Virginia
Culpeper County, Virginia
Spotsylvania County, Virginia
National Register of Historic Places in Orange County, Virginia
1714 establishments in Virginia